Beaulieu is a census-designated place and unincorporated community in Beaulieu and Chief Townships, Mahnomen County, Minnesota, United States. Its population was 48 as of the 2010 census.

Demographics

History
A post office called Beaulieu was established in 1891, and remained in operation until 1960. John Beaulieu, the postmaster, gave the community its name.

References

Census-designated places in Mahnomen County, Minnesota
Census-designated places in Minnesota